Max Kolonko (born Mariusz Max Kolonko in 1965, Lubliniec, Poland) is a Polish-American journalist. He won the Kisiel Prize for journalism in 2015.

References

External links

 Max Kolonko in The Huffington Post

American television personalities
Living people
1965 births
Polish emigrants to the United States